Denise Campbell may refer to:

 Denise Campbell (footballer) (born 1979), English footballer
 Denise Campbell (politician) (born 1964), American politician
 Denise Campbell Bauer, United States Ambassador to Belgium